Lycaena gorgon, known generally as the gorgon copper or stream water-crowfoot, is a species of copper in the butterfly family Lycaenidae. It is found in North America.

The MONA or Hodges number for Lycaena gorgon is 4255.

Subspecies
These four subspecies belong to the species Lycaena gorgon:
 Lycaena gorgon dorothea J. Emmel & Pratt in T. Emmel, 1998
 Lycaena gorgon gorgon (Boisduval, 1852)
 Lycaena gorgon jacquelineae J. Emmel & Pratt in T. Emmel, 1998
 Lycaena gorgon micropunctata J. Emmel & Pratt in T. Emmel, 1998

References

Further reading

External links

 

Lycaena
Articles created by Qbugbot
Butterflies described in 1852